Alonso Morales (born 1 March 1947) is a Colombian sports shooter. He competed in the mixed trap event at the 1984 Summer Olympics.

References

1947 births
Living people
Colombian male sport shooters
Olympic shooters of Colombia
Shooters at the 1984 Summer Olympics
Place of birth missing (living people)
20th-century Colombian people